Land of the Lost is a 2009 American science fiction adventure comedy film directed by Brad Silberling,  written by Chris Henchy and Dennis McNicholas and starring Will Ferrell, Danny McBride and Anna Friel, loosely based on the 1974 Sid and Marty Krofft television series of the same name. The film was theatrically released on June 5, 2009 by Universal Pictures.

The film received generally negative reviews from critics and was a box office bomb, grossing just $68 million against its $100 million budget. It received seven Golden Raspberry Award nominations, including Worst Picture, winning Worst Prequel, Remake, Rip-off or Sequel.

Plot
The enthusiastic founder of "quantum paleontology", Dr. Rick Marshall has a low-level job at the La Brea Tar Pits, three years after a disastrous interview with Matt Lauer on Today went viral and ruined his career. Doctoral candidate from Cambridge Holly Cantrell tells him that his controversial theories combining time warps and paleontology inspired her.

She shows him a fossil with an imprint of a cigarette lighter that he recognizes as his own, along with a crystal made into a necklace that gives off strong tachyon energy. She convinces him to finish his tachyon amplifier and go on an expedition to the Devil's Canyon Mystery Cave theme park where she found the fossil.

As they float into the cave on a small inflatable raft with the theme park's owner Will Stanton in the role of a paddler and narrator, Marshall detects high levels of tachyons. Activating the tachyon amplifier creates an earth-shaking time warp the raft falls into. Having regained their senses in a sandy desert interspersed with items from many eras and discovered that the amplifier is nowhere to be seen, the three travellers rescue an apeman by the name of Chaka, who becomes their friend and guide.

They spend the night in a cave where they have taken refuge from the pursuing telepathically endowed tyrannosaur they nickname "Grumpy", who develops a grudge against Marshall for being intellectually disparaged. In the morning, Marshall receives a telepathic invocation for help and is being drawn to run towards ancient ruins, where they encounter reptiloids called the Sleestak before meeting Enik the Altrusian, who sent the message. Exiled by the Zarn, who wants to take over Earth with his Sleestak minions, Enik can prevent the invasion if Marshall gets the tachyon amplifier.

Led by Chaka, the group enters a rocky wasteland littered with artefacts from different epochs, encountering compsognathuses, dromaeosaurs, Grumpy, and a female allosaur nicknamed "Big Alice". These last two are battling it out over the remains of an ice-cream seller killed by the dromaeosaurs, until they sense Marshall and chase him. Marshall kills Big Alice with liquid nitrogen, finding the amplifier was eaten by the allosaur. But a pteranodon snatches the amplifier into its caldera incubator. Treading lightly on the thin volcanic-glass floor of the glowing caldera, Marshall gives himself over to the music of A Chorus Line coming from the tachyon amplifier, and dancingly meanders between the pterosaur eggs towards the device. When he reaches it, the playback suddenly stops. The eggs begin to hatch, and they realize the music was keeping the baby pterosaurs asleep. Marshall, Will and Holly belt out "I Hope I Get It", with Chaka joining in to display a great singing voice, much to everyone's surprise.

While Marshall, Will and Chaka celebrate, Holly takes a dinosaur egg and learns from a recording left by the long-deceased Zarn that Enik is lying (he is the one planning the Earth invasion). She is captured by Sleestak, and brought to the Library of Skulls for judgment. The others save her, but the villain, with the amplifier, and controlling the Sleestak, leaves to open a portal to Earth.

Marshall pole-vaults into Grumpy's maw and, by dislodging an intestinal obstruction, earns the beast's gratitude. Riding atop the tyrannosaur, he joins the others to defeat the Sleestak army and confront Enik. After the crystal link between the Land of the Lost and Earth is shattered, Enik reveals the portal will close forever. Thinking fast, Marshall grabs Holly's crystal, inserting it into the port. Knowing the substitute crystal won't hold for long, they leave quickly. Will chooses to stay, and is later welcomed by a bevy of cheerful and attractive girls of Chaka's tribe.

A triumphant Marshall reappears on Today with the dinosaur egg Holly brought back, promoting his new book "Matt Lauer Can Suck It!" The egg left behind on the Today set hatches a baby Sleestak, which hisses as the screen goes black.

Cast
The names of characters are given exactly as in the credits at the end of the film.
 Will Ferrell as Dr. Rick Marshall
 Anna Friel as Holly Cantrell
 Danny McBride as Will Stanton
 Jorma Taccone as Chaka
 John Boylan as Enik
 Matt Lauer as Matt Lauer
 Ben Best as Ernie
 Leonard Nimoy as the Zarn

Production
Production for the film began on March 4, 2008. Only one week's worth of filming was shot using a large-scale soundstage with green screen technology. The rest of filming took place on location in places such as the Dumont Dunes in the Mojave Desert, the La Brea Tar Pits in Hancock Park, and Trona, California.

Marketing
The first trailer was shown during Super Bowl XLIII. Subway Restaurants, which paid to appear in the film and had cross promotions with (appearing on their cups), unveiled the second trailer exclusively on their website. JW Marriott Hotels and Pop Rocks also purchased rights to market with film tie-ins. Syfy aired a marathon of the original series on Memorial Day in 2009 in coordination with the studio to have frequent film clips and an interview with Sid and Marty Krofft. After the film's release, another marathon aired on Chiller on June 6. The majority of the first two seasons were also made available on Hulu. Ahead of the film's release, Universal also released the complete series on DVD; it had previously been released by Rhino Home Video. The entire series is also available via download from Xbox Live. Two different games were released online to promote the film. "Chakker" was available to play on the film's official Web site while "Crystal Adventure" was a free downloadable game for iPhones from Kewlbox. Both Subway and MapQuest hosted an online sweepstakes on their respective Web sites with various movie-related merchandise given away as prizes. Both sweepstakes ran from May 18 through June 7 of 2009. Ferrell also appeared on the season 4 premiere of Man vs. Wild, which aired June 2, 2009, to promote the film.

Music
The score to Land of the Lost was composed by Michael Giacchino, who recorded his score with an 88-piece ensemble of the Hollywood Studio Symphony and a 35-person choir. On May 10, it was also announced by Dave Mustaine on TheLiveLine that some music from Megadeth would appear in the film. Whether this would be music from the new record was not entirely clear, however during the phone message Mustaine stated that there was new music playing in the background of the message. However parts of the song "The Right to Go Insane", from the 2009 album Endgame, can be heard near the end of the film. In the film, Rick Marshall sings the original Land of the Lost theme and two other tracks (Tracks 5 and 27) utilize parts of the theme as well., The musical A Chorus Line plays a part in the story, and Ferrell sings Cher's 1998 dance pop hit "Believe". Varèse Sarabande released the soundtrack album on June 9, 2009 (tracks 30-32 are bonus tracks).

Differences from original series
The film is a campy parody of the original TV series about the adventures of a father and his two children. While the first names remain the same, the film converts the Holly character into an unrelated research assistant to allow for more risqué humor because she is the main character's love interest.  Will, instead of being a son, is a theme park owner.  Rick Marshall is a paleontologist in the film, not a park ranger as in the original series. The film's budget also uses CGI special effects rather than the puppet and stop motion animation effects that defined the original series.  While the original Saturday morning show targeted a child audience, the film was intended for an adult audience and includes profanity, sex, drug references, and other adult-oriented material.

The actors who played Holly and Will in the TV series, Kathy Coleman and Wesley Eure, filmed cameos for the film. However, the final version of the film cut these scenes.

Release
On its opening day of June 5, the film was a box office flop by grossing only $7.9 million. The film performed under expectations in its first weekend in theaters, its $19 million opening was far less than the expected $30 million. The film's box office results fell far behind that of the 2009 comedy The Hangover, which opened during the same weekend. The film's opening weekend gross was about two-thirds what Universal reportedly expected to earn. It made $69 million worldwide. In 2014, the Los Angeles Times listed the film as one of the most expensive box office flops of all time.

Reception

Rotten Tomatoes reports an approval rating of 26% based on 191 reviews, with an average rating of 4.20/10. The site's critical consensus reads, "Only loosely based on the original TV series, Land of the Lost is decidedly less kid-friendly and feels more like a series of inconsistent sketches than a cohesive adventure comedy." On Metacritic the film has a weighted average score of 32 out of 100, based on 32 critics, indicating "generally unfavorable reviews". Audiences polled by CinemaScore gave the film an average grade of "C+" on an F to A+ scale.

Owen Gleiberman of Entertainment Weekly remarked that it "has stray amusing tidbits, but overall it leaves you feeling splattered", Kirk Honeycutt  of The Hollywood Reporter wrote: "Lame sketch comedy, an uninspired performance from Will Ferrell and an overall failure of the imagination turn Brad Silberling's Land of the Lost into a lethargic meander through a wilderness of misfiring gags." The Wall Street Journal stated that it "isn't worth the celluloid it's printed on".  The New York Daily News called it "a high-concept disaster".  The Miami Herald commented that "the whole thing feels at least three summers too stale."

Roger Ebert gave the film a rating of 3 out of 4, and said that despite the widespread disdain he had "moderate admiration" for the film. Ebert wrote "I guess you have to be in the mood for a goofball picture like this. I guess I was." Dana Stevens of Slate.com called it "an enjoyable regression to Saturday mornings gone by, as junky and sweet as a strawberry Pop-Tart."

Response from creators
At the Savannah Film Festival in 2011, Ron Meyer (president of Universal Pictures), said that "Land of the Lost was just crap. I mean, there was no excuse for it. The best intentions all went wrong." In 2012, Danny McBride defended the film, saying "There are the purists, who I always read about, that are like, 'I can't believe you're raping my childhood.' If Land of the Lost is your childhood, and we're raping it, I apologize. I think the show is awesome, and I think [screenwriters] Chris Henchy and Dennis McNicholas keep the mythology intact without taking it too seriously. If it was taken too seriously, it's just Jurassic Park. We've seen that movie before. This is a more interesting take on that tone."

Sid & Marty Krofft apologized for the film at a 2017 Comic-Con appearance, calling it "one of the worst films ever made", saying that they had very little involvement in the film and only sporadically visited the set.

Awards

Empire magazine's Sam Toy put the film #8 on his best of the year list. 
On February 1, 2010, the film led the 30th Golden Raspberry Awards with seven nominations (tied with Transformers: Revenge of the Fallen) including Worst Picture, Worst Actor (Ferrell), Worst Director (Silberling), Worst Screenplay, Worst Supporting Actor (Taccone), Worst Screen Couple (Ferrell and any co-star, creature or "comic riff") and Worst Prequel, Remake, Rip-off or Sequel. The film won the Worst Prequel, Remake, Rip-off or Sequel award.

Home media
The DVD was released on October 13, 2009, with sales reaching $20,286,563 as of August 2011.

See also
 Land of the Lost (1974 TV series), the original children's television series created by Sid and Marty Krofft
 List of Land of the Lost episodes
 Land of the Lost characters and species
 Land of the Lost (1991 TV series), the TV remake of the original series

References

External links

 
 
 
 Interview with Sid and Marty Krofft on Sci Fi Channel

2000s English-language films
2000s American films
2000s adventure comedy films
2009 fantasy films
2009 science fiction films
2009 films
American adventure comedy films
American science fiction comedy films
American satirical films
Films about dinosaurs
Films scored by Michael Giacchino
Films based on television series
Films directed by Brad Silberling
Films set in prehistory
Giant monster films
Land of the Lost
Films about parallel universes
2000s parody films
Relativity Media films
Sid and Marty Krofft
Films about time travel
Universal Pictures films
2000s satirical films
2009 comedy films
Living dinosaurs in fiction